Iridomyrmex niger is a species of ant in the genus Iridomyrmex. Described by Heterick and Shattuck in 2011, the species is endemic to multiple states in Australia.

Etymology
The name derives from the Latin language, which translates as 'black', which refers to its appearance of only being black.

References

Iridomyrmex
Hymenoptera of Australia
Insects described in 2011